Fyodor Fyodorovich Petrov (16 March 1902, Doktorovo, Tula Governorate – 19 August 1978) was a Soviet artillery designer.

References

1902 births
1978 deaths
People from Venyovsky District
People from Tula Governorate
Russian inventors
Weapon designers
Heroes of Socialist Labour
Stalin Prize winners